Masortim (singular: Masorti), the self-appellation of traditional, not strictly observant Jews in Israel, who mostly identify with Orthodox Judaism
 Conservative Judaism, often named Masorti ('traditional') outside North America.
 Masorti Olami, international umbrella organization of Conservative Judaism